Harri is a given name, and may refer to:

Guto Harri (born 1966), Welsh former BBC Chief Political Correspondent
Harri Anne Smith, American Republican member of the Alabama Senate
Harri Eloranta (born 1963), Finnish biathlete
Harri Hänninen (born 1963), Finnish long-distance runner
Harri Haatainen (born 1978), Finnish javelin thrower
Harri Hakkarainen (born 1969), Finnish javelin thrower
Harri Holkeri (born 1937), Prime Minister of Finland from 1987 to 1991
Harri Huhtala (born 1952), Finnish hammer thrower
Harri Hursti (born 1968), Finnish computer programmer and former chairman of the board and co-founder of ROMmon
Harri Jõgisalu (1922–2014), Estonian writer
T. Harri Jones (1921–1965), Welsh poet and university lecturer
Harri Kampman (born 1954), Finnish football manager and former player
Harri Kirvesniemi (born 1958), Finnish cross country skier
Harri Koskela (born 1965), Finnish wrestler and Olympic medalist in Greco-Roman wrestling
Harri Koskinen (born 1970), Finnish designer
Harri Linnonmaa (born 1946), Finnish ice hockey player
Harri Lorenzi (born 1949), Brazilian agronomic engineer
Harri Lumi (born 1933), Estonian former Communist politician
Harri Mänty (born 1971), Swedish musician, brought up in Finland
Harri Olli (born 1985), Finnish ski jumper
Harri Õunapuu (born 1947), Estonian politician
Harri Porten (born 1972), German software engineer
Harri Roschier (born 1957), Finnish entrepreneur
Harri Rovanperä (born 1966), Finnish rally driver
Harri Siljander (born 1922), Finnish boxer
Harri Sjöström (born 1952), Finnish saxophonist who specializes in the soprano saxophone
Harri Stojka (born 1957), Austrian jazz guitarist
Harri Tiido (born 1953), Estonian diplomat
Harri Toivonen (born 1960), Finnish rally and race car driver
Harri Webb (1920–1994), Anglo-Welsh poet, journalist and Welsh nationalist

Other uses
Harri Jones Memorial Prize for Poetry, annual prize awarded by the University of Newcastle, Australia

See also
Harris (surname)
Harry (disambiguation)
Hari (disambiguation)

Finnish masculine given names
Estonian masculine given names